Ol' Rip (died January 19, 1929) was a Texas horned lizard⁠—commonly referred to as a "horned toad" or "horny toad"⁠—famous during the Jazz Age which supposedly survived a 31-year hibernation as an entombed animal. The reptile's name was a reference to American writer Washington Irving's fictional character Rip Van Winkle. 

Following its alleged exhumation from a cornerstone in Eastland, Texas on February 18, 1928, the lizard became a national celebrity and appeared in 1920s motion pictures. The same year, a Texas political delegation led by Senator Earle Mayfield presented the docile lizard to President Calvin Coolidge at the White House for his inspection. 

As a consequence of the creature's fame, horned toads were sold by the thousands as souvenirs at public events including the 1928 Democratic National Convention. The ensuing mass capture and export of the horned toads resulted in the genus' abrupt decline in West Central Texas and prompted an intervention by the Texas Department of Agriculture.

Decades later, the saga of Ol' Rip inspired Looney Tunes scribe Michael Maltese to write a 1955 animated theatrical short entitled One Froggy Evening. In the cartoon, a construction worker demolishing an old building finds an 1897 time capsule inside a cornerstone. The capsule contains a living toad which is able to sing Tin Pan Alley songs such as "Hello! Ma Baby" and "I'm Just Wild About Harry".

History

Alleged entombment 

On July 29, 1897, a 4-year-old boy named Will Wood caught a horny toad in Eastland County, Texas. The boy's father, Eastland County clerk Ernest E. Wood, decided to use the reptile to test the West Texas tradition that the creatures could survive for many years in hibernation. The horned lizard was placed in a cornerstone of the Eastland County Courthouse in Eastland, Texas along with other time capsule memorabilia, including a Bible and a bottle of alcohol. 

Thirty years later during the Jazz Age, construction workers began to tear down the old courthouse, and town officials scheduled a public event to open the time capsule in mid-February 1928. An ambitious young newspaperman named Boyce House reported on the forthcoming ceremony in his articles for the Fort Worth Star-Telegram. House particularly emphasized the mystery of the horned toad which supposedly had been entombed in the capsule since 1897.

As a result of Boyce's sensationalist newspaper articles, a crowd of 1,500 spectators gathered in Eastland, Texas, to witness the opening of the time capsule and to learn the fate of the horned toad. Many spectators had traveled more than 25 miles to be present, and hundreds thronged around the makeshift fence that encircled the old courthouse. At exactly four o'clock on Saturday, February 18, 1928, a live horned lizard was allegedly produced from within the time capsule in front of the overly-excited audience. Newspaperman Boyce House recalled the chaotic scene:

Within days, national newspaper chains reported the discovery of the entombed lizard on their front pages.  The New York Times reported the event on its front page with the declarative headline: "Toad Alive After 31 Years Sealed in Texas Cornerstone". The Times article credulously reported:

Following these newspaper reports, zoologists and other scientists began a public debate over whether a Texas horned toad could survive for such an extended period of time without water, sunlight or oxygen. Dr. Raymond L. Ditmars, curator of mammals and reptiles at the Bronx Zoo, declared the alleged survival of the entombed lizard in Eastland, Texas, to be "utterly impossible." In contrast, preeminent naturalist William T. Hornaday, the curator of the New York Zoological Gardens, asserted "that the incident was possible⁠—and gave an instance from his own experience in Ceylon." Indifferent to this scientific debate, Eastland locals instead ascribed the horned toad's "miraculous" survival for thirty-one years to the presence of the Bible in the time capsule.

National fame 

Due to the extensive media coverage, Ol' Rip became a national celebrity. The docile lizard was transported to Dallas, Texas, for public exhibition by Will Wood, the same individual who purportedly found the specimen as a boy in 1897. After a public outcry by Eastland inhabitants and profit-hungry businessmen over the removal of the famous creature from their otherwise nondescript and insignificant town, Wood returned Ol' Rip to Eastland. Dallas exhibitors promptly sued Wood for $6,000 for alleged breach of contract.

After this incident, Ol' Rip went on a national tour, and forty thousand spectators viewed him at the Zoological Gardens in St. Louis, Missouri. Later that same year in New York City, motion pictures were produced with Will Wood introducing Ol' Rip, and "a bug-catcher was paid 50 cents each for insects that the frog devoured to please the camera man."

The peak of Rip's fame occurred in May 1928 when, during his national tour, the lizard was transported to Washington, D.C. where Texas Senator Earle Bradford Mayfield presented the specimen to President Calvin "Silent Cal" Coolidge. A bemused Coolidge purportedly declined to touch the horned toad and merely nudged it with his spectacles. A newspaper article reported the incident:

As a consequence of the creature's immense fame, horned toads were sold as souvenirs at $2.50 each at the 1928 Democratic National Convention in Houston, Texas.  The ensuing mass capture and export of horned toads for such sales resulted in the genus' precipitous decline in West Texas. According to Texas journalist Boyce House:

Death and controversy 
Soon after his national tour, Ol' Rip died of pneumonia on January 19, 1929. After Ol' Rip's death, the specimen was kept in a tiny satin-lined casket and displayed in the lobby of the new Eastland courthouse. 

Decades later, in September 1961, Old Rip briefly disappeared from the museum exhibit, and a ransom note demanded $10,000 for his return. After a city-wide search, the specimen was recovered. A year later, in 1962, John Connally visited the courthouse while running for governor of Texas for a publicity event. An impetuous Connally lifted the embalmed creature by its hind leg which abruptly detached.

In 1972, Rip's body was again stolen. Soon after, the City of Eastland claimed they had somehow "found" the stolen specimen and returned the object to exhibition. However, museum visitors noted the "recovered" toad now inexplicably had four feet, while the original specimen only had three feet, presumably due to the earlier 1962 incident with John Connally.

In 1976, an anonymous letter was sent to newspapers claiming the original, three-footed specimen was still in the thief's possession, and the City of Eastland had replaced the original specimen with a fake. Angry that "the city of Eastland was building its future around a dried-up horned frog," the letter-writer offered to pay $5,000 to anyone who could prove the toad in the courthouse was truly Ol' Rip.

Legacy and influence 
In 1955, Looney Tunes writer Michael Maltese was inspired by the story of Ol' Rip to write an animated theatrical short entitled One Froggy Evening. In the cartoon, a construction worker demolishing a building finds an 1897 time capsule inside a cornerstone. The capsule contains a living frog, retroactively named Michigan J. Frog years later, which is able to sing Tin Pan Alley songs; in particular, "Hello! Ma Baby" and "I'm Just Wild About Harry".

See also 
 Michigan J. Frog

References

Citations

Works cited

External links 
 
 
 

1929 animal deaths
Individual lizards
Individual taxidermy exhibits
Eastland County, Texas